The Awakening (Traditional Chinese: 霧鎖南洋, Simplified Chinese: 雾锁南洋) is a 1984 television drama series produced by Singapore Broadcasting Corporation to celebrate the nation's 25th National Day celebrations. The series mainly covers the Chinese Singaporean experience in Singapore, from the first generation of Chinese immigrants, who arrived to a relatively undeveloped island, through the Japanese occupation periods, and to the Chinese Singaporeans at the present day (1984), who resides in a developed nation that is radically different from the land their ancestors arrived to.

Synopsis
There are two parts to the series, and two sections in each of the parts:

The first series consisted of two parts, The Awakening: Eternity (霧鎖南洋之地久天長) and The Awakening: Before the Dawn of the Lion City (霧鎖南洋之獅城拂曉/雾锁南洋之狮城拂晓). The former covers the lives of Chinese Singaporeans, who came to Singapore as migrants from China in the early part of the 20th century and the latter covers the Japanese occupation of Singapore. The series cover the period between 1920 to 1945.

The second series consisted of two parts, The Awakening: Through the Storm Together (霧鎖南洋之風雨同舟/雾锁南洋之风雨同舟) and The Awakening: Dawn at the Equator (霧鎖南洋之赤道朝陽/雾锁南洋之赤道朝阳). THe former covers the years after the Japanese occupation, and the events that led to Singapore's independence and the latter covers the development of Singapore after its independence.

Cast
1st series
 Huang Wenyong as He Ah Shui
 Xiang Yun as Ah Mei
 Wang Yuqing as He Guorui
 Chen Shucheng as Dr Chuang Yuanhe
 Huang Peiru as Qian Tianlan
 Li Jian Han as He Tian Sheng
 Li Yong Xi as Chuang De Xing
 Xu Lin as Chuang Xiaolan
 Chen Bi Feng as Xiao Pei
 Wu Weiqiang as Qian Jiacheng
 Chen Juanjuan as Mrs Qian
 He Jie as Qian Yuwei
 Candlelane Chen Tiansong as Kawashima
 Qian Zhigang as Hu De
 Wang Xiang Qin as He Zhu Sheng
 Steven Woon as Ah Xiang
 Hong Peixing as He Ah Bing
 Teh Poh Khoon as Xiu Gu

2nd series
 Xu Lin
 Li Wenhai
 Li Yinzhu
 Huang Wenyong
 Xiang Yun 
 Hong Huifang
 Candlelane Chen Tiansong
 Hugo Ng
 Li Huiyan
 Chen Tianwen
 Liu Qiu Lian
 Chen Shucheng

Production 
An outdoor studio was built at the cost of $500,000 to film the drama. Period costumes and antiques were sourced overseas to match the era of the drama.

Reception 
The first series of the drama received an audience of 800,000 adults.

Legacy
The Awakening is often seen as one of Singapore's pioneer Chinese Dramas. To this day, it is considered a Classic among Singaporean viewers and the theme song remains popular. Actors Huang Wenyong and Xiang Yun were catapulted to fame through this drama. The second main actor and actress Chen Shucheng and Huang Peiru who played a couple, eventually married after the drama was broadcast.

Perfect World Pictures (Singapore) will be shooting a reboot of the series in 2018 with Tay Ping Hui in a starring role.

References

Singapore Chinese dramas
1984 Singaporean television series debuts
1980s Singaporean television series
Channel 8 (Singapore) original programming